The 2010 FIFA World Cup AFC–OFC qualification play-off was a two-legged home-and-away tie between the winners of the Oceania qualifying tournament, New Zealand, and the fifth-placed team from the Asian qualifying tournament, Bahrain.

The games were played on 10 October and 14 November 2009 in Riffa and Wellington, respectively. With New Zealand winning 1–0 on aggregate score in order to qualify for the FIFA World Cup for the first time since the 1982 tournament.

It was the second consecutive FIFA World Cup play-off Bahrain played, Bahrain lost 2–1 on aggregate to Trinidad and Tobago in their previous play-off.

New Zealand took part in their first FIFA World Cup inter-confederation play-off after years of Australia appearing in the inter-confederation play-offs of 1986 vs Scotland, 1994 (1st play-off vs Canada and 2nd play-off vs Argentina), 1998 vs Iran, 2002 vs Uruguay, and 2006 vs Uruguay, and Israel appearing in 1990 against Colombia.

The draw for the order in which the two matches would be played was held on 2 June 2009 during the FIFA Congress. New Zealand won 1–0 on aggregate and a second consecutive appearance for an OFC team in the FIFA World Cup.

Venues

Background

Match details

First leg

Second leg

|}

Aftermath 
New Zealand qualified for the 2010 FIFA World Cup Finals in South Africa and were drawn into Group F with defending champions Italy, Slovakia and Paraguay. After drawing 1–1 with Slovakia in their opening match, New Zealand drew 1–1 with Italy, and in their final match, they also drew 0–0 with Paraguay; meaning they finished third in the group on three points. New Zealand's three draws meant that they were the only unbeaten team at the 2010 World Cup.

After the play-off, Bahrain qualified for the 2011 AFC Asian Cup in Qatar. They went on to finish third in Group C; losing 2–1 to South Korea in their opening match, then beating India 5–2, before being eliminated from the competition after a 1–0 defeat to Australia.

References 

FIFA
6
3
New Zealand national football team matches
Bahrain national football team matches
qual
FIFA World Cup qualification inter-confederation play-offs
play-off
October 2009 sports events in Asia
November 2009 sports events in New Zealand
2000s in Wellington
Sports competitions in Wellington
2009–10 in Bahraini football
International association football competitions hosted by Bahrain
International association football competitions hosted by New Zealand